Bouakaha (also known as Babakaha) is a town in northern Ivory Coast. It is a sub-prefecture of Sinématiali Department in Poro Region, Savanes District.

Bouakaha was a commune until March 2012, when it became one of 1126 communes nationwide that were abolished.

In 2014, the population of the sub-prefecture of Bouakaha was 5,704.

Villages
The 9 villages of the sub-prefecture of Bouakaha and their population in 2014 are:
 Bahouakaha (4 066)
 Dokinikaha (73)
 Kagnibelekaha (227)
 Ladonakaha (101)
 Ladounkaha (176)
 Namekaha (145)
 Nongotienekaha 1 (664)
 Peguekaha (160)
 Poromoukaha (92)

Notes

Sub-prefectures of Poro Region
Former communes of Ivory Coast